Brenda Lozano (born 1981) is a Mexican writer best known for her novel Loop which won the PEN Award on Translation.

Career 
She studied literature at the Universidad Iberoamericana. She has published two novels, Todo nada and Cuaderno ideal, and a book of short fiction Cómo piensan las piedras. In 2017, she was named as one of the Bogota 39, a selection of the best young writers in Latin America.

Cuaderno ideal was translated into English by Annie McDermott under the title Loop. In 2019 Loop was granted the PEN Award on Translation.

On the 16th of August, 2021 Brenda Lozano was posted to the Mexican embassy in Spain as a cultural attaché. Only four days later, however, president Andrés Manuel López Obrador complained Lozano had previously been critical of his policies and promptly rescinded the appointment.

List of works 
 Todo nada (2009)
 Cuaderno ideal / Loop (2014)
 Cómo piensan las piedras (2017)
 Brujas (2020)

Awards 
 PEN Award on Translation (2019)

References

External links 
 

Mexican writers
1981 births
Living people
Universidad Iberoamericana alumni